Marcel Cachin (20 September 1869 – 12 February 1958) was a French Communist politician and editor of the daily newspaper L'Humanite.

In 1891, Cachin joined Jules Guesde's French Workers' Party (POF). In 1905, he joined the new French Section of the Workers' International (SFIO) and won election to the Chamber of Deputies representing the Seine in 1914. He rallied the Union sacrée during the First World War and was sent to Russia in a mission in 1917. On that occasion he strongly supported Kerensky's Provisional Government, which was pledged to continue Russia's participation in World War I, and denounced Lenin and the Bolsheviks. In 1918, he was one of the speakers at a patriotic rally held at Strasbourg, to celebrate the city's  return to French rule.

However, following the end of the war, there was a leftward shift among Cachin's grassroots supporters and a growing sympathy for the October revolution. In 1920 at the Tours Congress, Cachin became one of the founders of the French Communist Party (SFIC) and joined the Third International. In 1923, he was jailed for denouncing the French occupation of the Ruhr and Morocco. As a strong supporter of the pro-Soviet Communist Party, he refused to disavow the Molotov–Ribbentrop Pact and was removed from elected office in 1940. After the Liberation of France, he returned to the National Assembly until his death in 1958.

He was the editor of the newspaper L'Humanité from 1918 to 1958.

At the age of 88, he was the first foreigner to receive the Order of Lenin. In the later part of his life, he was nicknamed "Grandfather of the Communist Party".

His granddaughter, Françoise Cachin, was an art historian.

Electoral results

Cachin was the candidate for President of France of the French Communist Party in four elections: 
Third Republic:
1931: 1.11% in the first round, 1.23% in the second round
1932: 0.97% in the first round
1939: 8.13% in the first round

Fourth Republic:
1953: 12.18% in the first round

References
 Biography on the French Senate website

External links
 

1869 births
1958 deaths
People from Côtes-d'Armor
Politicians from Brittany
French Workers' Party politicians
Socialist Party of France (1902) politicians
French Section of the Workers' International politicians
French Communist Party politicians
Members of the 11th Chamber of Deputies of the French Third Republic
Members of the 12th Chamber of Deputies of the French Third Republic
Members of the 13th Chamber of Deputies of the French Third Republic
Members of the 14th Chamber of Deputies of the French Third Republic
French Senators of the Third Republic
Senators of Seine (department)
Members of the Constituent Assembly of France (1945)
Members of the Constituent Assembly of France (1946)
Deputies of the 1st National Assembly of the French Fourth Republic
Deputies of the 2nd National Assembly of the French Fourth Republic
Deputies of the 3rd National Assembly of the French Fourth Republic
French Freemasons
Burials at Père Lachaise Cemetery